Living Death may refer to:

 Living Death (film), a 2009 South Korean horror film
 Living Death (band), a German heavy metal band
 The Living Death, a 1915 American short film
 The Living Death (Killmaster novel), a 1969 novel in the Nick Carter-Killmaster series